Plácido  is a 1961 Spanish black comedy film directed by Luis García Berlanga. It was nominated to the Academy Award as Best Foreign Language Film. It was also entered into the 1962 Cannes Film Festival.

Plot
In a small provincial town, a group of "pious" women who are fond of ostentatiously practicing charity organize a Christmas campaign under the motto "Feed a poor man at your table." In order to support the initiative, the sponsorship of a pot brand is sought and a group of second-rate artists who have come expressly from the capital and are received enthusiastically at the train station are invited. The humanitarian day is completed with a colorful parade, a public auction of the guests and a dramatic radio broadcast.

The person in charge of organizing this lavish chain of events is Quintanilla, who has hired Plácido for the occasion, a poor man who must utilize the motorcycle car that he has just acquired and has not yet begun to pay on. The hectic activity in which Plácido is involved prevents him from paying on time the first payment on the vehicle, which expires that same night. From that moment, Placido tries by all means to find a solution to his problem because his vehicle is what he uses to earn a living. However, he is taken from one place to another, involved in a series of unexpected incidents, including a comedy of errors involving an elderly beggar with heart problems.

The film is a race against time to get the money paid before the deadline expires. Berlanga's social satire pokes fun at rich people trying to soothe their consciences by helping a poor person for one day. Along the way we see their disgust at being near the poor, debates over whether it's better to choose a street person or an elderly poor person, and showing off "their" poor person to their friends as though they were a possession. Berlanga also pokes fun at actors more concerned about photo ops appearing to show them as charitable than actually being charitable.

Cast
 Cassen as Plácido Alonso (as Casto Sendra 'Cassen')
 José Luis López Vázquez as Gabino Quintanilla
 Elvira Quintillá as Emilia
 Manuel Alexandre as Julián Alonso
 Mario Bustos as (as Mario de Bustos)
 María Francés
 Mari Carmen Yepes as Martita (as Carmen Yepes)
 Jesús Puche as Don Arturo
 Roberto Llamas
 Amelia de la Torre as Doña Encarna de Galán
 Juan G. Medina
 José María Caffarel as Zapater
 Xan das Bolas as Rivas
 Laura Granados as Erika
 Juan Manuel Simón

Production

The idea for the film came from a campaign created by the Franco regime in the fifties that, under the slogan "Sit a poor man at your table", urged citizens to share Christmas Eve dinner with those who did not have enough resources to be guaranteed a hot meal. Far from being an example of altruistic charity, this campaign seemed to seek the reconciliation of citizens with their consciences through an isolated gesture of solidarity. This apparent selfishness camouflaged as false solidarity inspired Berlanga to write the screenplay for Plácido.

Reception
It was named best Spanish film of 1961 by the Círculo de Escritores Cinematográficos. Berlanga was named Best Director.

See also
 List of Christmas films
 List of submissions to the 34th Academy Awards for Best Foreign Language Film
 List of Spanish submissions for the Academy Award for Best Foreign Language Film

References

External links
 

1961 films
Spanish Christmas films
1960 comedy films
1960 films
1960s Spanish-language films
Spanish black-and-white films
Films directed by Luis García Berlanga
Films with screenplays by Rafael Azcona
1960s Christmas films
1961 comedy films